Cioroiași is a commune in Dolj County, Oltenia, Romania with a population of 2,006 people. It is composed of three villages: Cetățuia, Cioroiași and Cioroiu Nou.

References

Communes in Dolj County
Localities in Oltenia